Aleida Mathilde (Ada) van Keulen (13 January 1920, in Aalsmeer – 25 January 2010, in Laren, North Holland) was a Dutch woman who took part in the resistance during World War II.

Van Keulen headed a boy scout group in Hilversum, the Heidepark Group, which became illegal during the war and carried out work for the resistance. She was also a courier for Hessels en Van Wilgenburg. On June 13, 1944, she was betrayed and arrested together with 27 other resistance fighters in Amsterdam. Among others, they included Jo Hessels, Hendrik van Wilgenburg, and Joukje Grandia-Smits, all of whom were imprisoned.  Of the 27, only seven survived the war.

She was sent to Vught concentration camp and in September 1944 deported to Ravensbrück. In October, she was transferred to Dachau, where she was employed in the Agfa-Commando.

On April 30, 1945, van Keulen was freed by the Americans during the Wolfratshausen evacuation march.

References 
Mededelingen van C.B.- L.O. en Afwikkelingsbureau L.K.P., 3 augustus 1945: Een koerierster keerde terug! Interview met Ada van Keulen
Website Van Ommen Verzet
United States Holocaust Memorial Museum: Oral history interview with Joukje Grandia-Smits

Further reading 
Atwood, Kathryn J. Women Heroes of World War II: 26 Stories of Espionage, Sabotage, Resistance, and Rescue. Chicago: Chicago Review Press, 2011.  

1920 births
2010 deaths
Dutch resistance members
People from Aalsmeer